Neba or NEBA may refer to:

Neba, Nagano, village in  Nagano Prefecture, Japan
New England Biotech Association, a coalition of biotechnology companies
Neba'a Faour, an archaeological site in Lebanon
Northeast Bolivian Airways, a Bolivian airline company